Tagging, especially "yellow tag", is a term used in US aviation to indicate a part is serviceable and airworthy as evaluated by an FAA certified repair station. It is important to note that this term is an industry term and is not an FAA requirement or even mentioned in the Federal Aviation Regulations (FAR).

 Red Tag: component is scrap or unusable
 Yellow Tag: component is serviceable and airworthy
 Green Tag: component is not airworthy but is repairable

In Canada, a green tag is used for a serviceable and airworthy part, but as in the US, the presence of the tag does not guarantee that the part is legal for use in certificated aircraft.

The color coded system was developed by the U.S. Army Air Corps during World War II.

References

Aviation in the United States